In psychotherapy, systemic therapy seeks to address people not only on the individual level, as had been the focus of earlier forms of therapy, but also as people in relationships, dealing with the interactions of groups and their interactional patterns and dynamics.

History 
Systemic therapy has its roots in  family therapy, or more precisely family systems therapy as it later came to be known. In particular, systemic therapy traces its roots to the Milan school of Mara Selvini Palazzoli, but also derives from the work of Salvador Minuchin, Murray Bowen, Ivan Boszormenyi-Nagy, as well as Virginia Satir and Jay Haley from MRI in Palo Alto. These early schools of family therapy represented therapeutic adaptations of the larger interdisciplinary field of systems theory which originated in the fields of biology and physiology. 

Early forms of systemic therapy were based on cybernetics. In the 1970s this understanding of systems theory was central to the structural (Minuchin) and strategic (Haley, Selvini Palazzoli) schools of family therapy which would later develop into systemic therapy. In the light of postmodern critique, the notion that one could control systems or say objectively "what is" came increasingly into question. Based largely on the work of anthropologists Gregory Bateson and Margaret Mead, this resulted in a shift towards what is known as "second-order cybernetics" which acknowledges the influence of the subjective observer in any study, essentially applying the principles of cybernetics to cybernetics – examining the examination. 

As a result, the focus of systemic therapy (ca. 1980 and forward)  has moved away from a modernist model of linear causality and  understanding of reality as objective, to a postmodern understanding of reality as socially and linguistically constructed.

Practical application 
Systemic therapy approaches problems practically rather than analytically. It seeks to identify stagnant patterns of behavior within a living system - a group of people, such as a family. It then addresses those patterns directly, without analysing their cause. Systemic therapy does not attempt to determine past causes, such as subconscious impulses or childhood trauma, or to diagnose. Thus, it differs from psychoanalytic and psychodynamic forms of family therapy (for example, the work of Horst-Eberhard Richter).

A key point of this postmodern perspective is not a denial of absolutes. Instead, the therapist recognises that they do not hold the capacity to change people or systems. Their role is to introduce creative "nudges" which help systems to change themselves: 

While family systems therapy only addresses families, systemic therapy in a similar fashion to 
Systemic hypothesising addresses other systems. The systemic approach is increasingly used in business, education, politics, psychiatry, social work, and family medicine.

See also 
 List of therapies
 Systems theory
 Family therapy
 Systemic coaching
 Systems psychology

References 

Family therapy
Therapy